Sriimurali (born 17 December 1981), also known simply as Murali, is an Indian actor who works predominantly in Kannada cinema. After making his debut in 2003 in Chandra Chakori, he appeared in Kanti as the eponymous lead, a performance that won him the Karnataka State Film Award for Best Actor in 2004. His performance in the 2014 Kannada film Ugramm received unanimous praise and emerged as a major success.

Early and personal life
Sriimurali was born on 17 December 1981 in Bangalore, Karnataka, in a family of film people. His father S. A. Chinne Gowda is a film producer and brother Vijay Raghavendra, an actor. Actor Rajkumar was his uncle and actors Shiva Rajkumar and Puneeth Rajkumar his cousins. He married his Telugu girlfriend, Vidya from Andhra, on 11 May 2008. They have a son and a daughter together, who are non-identical twins. Vidya is the sister of Prashanth Neel, a director in Kannada cinema, and Aadarsh Balakrishna, an actor in Telugu Cinema.

Career
Sriimurali made his debut in films in 2003 with a romance film, Chandra Chakori. The film performed well and his performance received praise. In Kanti set in the backdrop of the Karnataka–Maharashtra border dispute, he played the eponymous lead of a college student who, on falling in love with a Marathi girl, gets embroiled politically. His performance won him the Karnataka State Film Award for Best Actor.

Sriimurali then appeared in films such as Siddu, Shambu, Yashwant and Preethigaagi, which did not perform well at the box office. In 2008, he appeared in Minchina Ota, produced by his father, also starring brother Vijay Raghavendra. He also takes care of the production responsibilities of his family banner Sowbhagya Pictures, under which several films produced by his father were made such as Sevanthi Sevanthi and Ganesha Mathe Bandha. 
After a hit Chandra Chakori, Sri Murali could not keep up the expectations of the audiences and all of his consecutive films were flops. 

Prashanth Neel (Murali's brother in law) came up with an action drama story in 2008, exclusively for taking off Sri Murali's career again on a high note. The movie was initially named Nandhe and later changed to Ugramm. It took nearly 4–5 years for completion of the project, which marked Neel's directorial debut. The film was released in 2014. In the film, Sri Murali played the role of Agastya, a mechanic, who protects Nithya (played by Haripriya) from being caught alive by goons, and takes on the mafia. The film emerged as a critical and commercial success with his performance receiving acclaim. A. Sharadhaa of The Indian Express wrote: "This is definitely a 'comeback' film for Murali, a carefully thought-out project for him by the director. Murali is smarter than he looks and tougher than people expected him to be." He received his first nominations for Best Actor in Filmfare Awards South and SIIMA Awards. Following the massive success of the film, it was reported that he was flooded with offers for film totaling to 67, all of which he rejected.

Filmography
Note: He was credited as Murali from 2003 to 2007. He was credited as Sriimurali from 2008 onwards.

Awards

References

External links

 

Indian male film actors
Male actors in Kannada cinema
Male actors in Telugu cinema
Male actors in Malayalam cinema
Living people
Male actors from Bangalore
21st-century Indian male actors
1981 births